The Elizabethtown Area School District is a school district in the Northwest corner of Lancaster County, Pennsylvania, United States that serves Elizabethown Borough and the townships of Conoy, and West Donegal, as well as the North and West part of Mount Joy Township. It is a member of Lancaster-Lebanon Intermediate Unit (IU) 13.

Schools
Schools in the Elizabethtown Area School District include:
 Elizabethtown Area High School
 Elizabethtown Middle School
 Bainbridge Elementary
 East High Elementary
 Mill Road Elementary
 Rheems Elementary
 Bear Creek Intermediate School

National/State Recognition 
The high school has won state championships in field hockey in 1974, baseball in 1993. The district's Quiz Bowl Team was national runner up at the 2004 National Academic Championship.

In November 2015, Mill Road Elementary School was honored as a National Blue Ribbon School.  In that same year, East High Elementary School was honored as a "High Achievement Reward School".

District profile 

 As of the census of 2000
 District Population: 27,485 people
 District Area: 
 School Colors - Blue and White
 District Mascot - Elizabethtown Bears
 School Nickname - "E-Town"
 Member of the Lancaster-Lebanon 2 Sports League

Notable Graduates 

 Nelson Chittum, former MLB pitcher
 Gene Garber, former major league baseball pitcher with the Pittsburgh Pirates, Kansas City Royals, Philadelphia Phillies, and Atlanta Braves.

References

External links
 Elizabethtown Area School District
 Elizabethtown Area High School
 Elizabethtown Middle School
 Bainbridge Elementary School
 East High Elementary School
 Fairview Elementary School
 Mill Road Elementary School
 Rheems Elementary School
 Lancaster-Lebanon Intermediate Unit 13
 Lancaster-Lebanon Sports League

School districts in Lancaster County, Pennsylvania